Marina Tumas (born September 17, 1984) is a Belarusian volleyball player. She is 188 cm. She plays for İller Bankası Team in Turkey.

External links
 Player profile at fenerbahce.org

1981 births
Living people
Belarusian women's volleyball players
Fenerbahçe volleyballers
İller Bankası volleyballers
Expatriate volleyball players in Azerbaijan
Expatriate volleyball players in Turkey
Belarusian expatriate sportspeople in Azerbaijan
Belarusian expatriate sportspeople in Turkey
Sportspeople from Minsk